Hege Christin Vikebø (born 15 June 1978) is a Norwegian team handball player.

Vikebø made her debut on the national team in 1999, against Netherlands. She played 22 matches and scored 19 goals for the national team up to her latest representation in 2006. She played for the national team at the 2000 European Women's Handball Championship in Romania, when Norway finished 6th.

References

1978 births
Living people
Norwegian female handball players
Sportspeople from Bergen